Strecker Memorial Laboratory is a historic building located in Southpoint Park on Roosevelt Island in New York City.

Built in 1892 to serve as a laboratory for City Hospital, it was "the first institution in the nation for pathological and bacteriological research". The project was funded by the Strecker family. The building was designed by architects Frederick Clarke Withers and Walter Dickson in the Romanesque Revival style with large arched windows to provide plenty of natural lighting and ventilation. On the first floor were an autopsy room and an office, while the floor above housed laboratories where specimens were examined. The cellar was used as a mortuary and for storage. Administrative support was provided by the nearby City Hospital. An additional storey was later built, providing room for the examination of histological samples, a scientific library and a pathology museum.

In 1907, the Russell Sage Institute of Pathology took over the running of the lab. In time, this became associated with the Rockefeller University, and work continued at the laboratory until it closed in the 1950s, after which it fell into disrepair.

In 1972, it was added to the National Register of Historic Places, and in 1976 it was designated a New York City landmark. The Metropolitan Transportation Authority decided to use the structure to house a power conversion substation for the subway trains that run through the 53rd Street Tunnel underneath Roosevelt Island. The city faithfully restored the building, and the substation has been active since 2000.

See also
List of New York City Designated Landmarks in Manhattan on Islands
National Register of Historic Places listings in Manhattan on islands

References

Infrastructure completed in 1892
Roosevelt Island
Romanesque Revival architecture in New York City
Industrial buildings and structures on the National Register of Historic Places in New York City
Buildings and structures on the National Register of Historic Places in Manhattan
New York City Designated Landmarks in Manhattan
Laboratories in the United States
Electrical substations